Jan Miner (October 15, 1917 – February 15, 2004) was an American actress best known for her role as the character "Madge", the manicurist in Palmolive dish-washing detergent television commercials beginning in the 1960s.

Biography

Early life and career

Jan Miner, the daughter of a dentist and a painter, whose siblings included three brothers, Sheldon, Donald and Lyndsey, studied at the Vesper George School of Art in her native Boston, Massachusetts. She went on to study acting with Lee Strasberg and others before making her stage debut in 1945 in a Boston production of Elmer Rice's Street Scene.

Miner then became a well-established actress on radio, and through the 1950s was one of many busy performers working in multiple series simultaneously. Among other roles, she was one of three sequential actresses who voiced secretary Della Street on Perry Mason, one of five to play girlfriend Ann Williams on Casey, Crime Photographer, and Mary Wesley on Boston Blackie.

Miner played featured roles in the 1948-1950 dramatic anthology series Radio City Playhouse ("Soundless", "Portrait of Lenore," et al.).  It was, though, her appearance in the premiere broadcast of the series that "created a minor sensation in the play Long Distance"; the episode proved so popular that she repeated her performance later in the season.

From circa 1948 through some time before the series ended in 1957, Miner, eventually succeeded by Grace Matthews, starred as Julie Erickson, head of the titular orphanage in the revival of the 1937–1941 soap opera Hilltop House. The series was sponsored by the Colgate-Palmolive Company, for which she would later appear in a famous, long-running series of television commercials.

Broadway career
As radio drama faded with the popularity of television, Miner made her New York City theater debut in the 1958 melodrama Obbligato at Theatre Marquee, adapted by Jane Hinton Gates from the novel Une Ombre by Paul Vialar; Miner starred as a spinster in romantic competition with her younger sister, played by Carol Vandermeir. Her Broadway debut came two years later, in the very short-lived (April 6–7, 1960) advertising-world comedy Viva Madison Avenue!, by George Panetta, at the Longacre Theatre.

Television icon
Miner appeared on television in, among other shows, Boston Blackie and Casey, Crime Photographer, in roles she originated on radio. But she became an icon to TV viewers as Madge, the wisecracking manicurist in commercials for Palmolive dish-washing detergent. In an advertising campaign created by the agency Ted Bates Advertising, Miner played Madge, who worked at the Salon East Beauty Parlor and soaked her customers’ fingernails in Palmolive ("Palmolive softens hands while you do the dishes"). The campaign ran from 1966 to 1992.

Miner's Palmolive commercials would appear in France (where Madge was "Françoise"), Germany, Switzerland, and Austria (in all three as "Tilly"), Finland (as "Marissa"), Denmark, and Italy. In Australia and New Zealand, the Madge character was played by Robina Beard.

Madge's trademark line became one of the more famous and parodied television commercial quotes:

Miner was a regular on the 1974 CBS situation comedy Paul Sand in Friends and Lovers in which she played the mother of the character portrayed by Paul Sand.

Theater and film career
Following her 1960 debut, Miner appeared on Broadway in The Milk Train Doesn't Stop Here Anymore (1963) and Butterflies Are Free (1972) (in each as an understudy); the 1973 revival of The Women; the 1976 revival of The Heiress with Jane Alexander; the 1980 revival of Watch on the Rhine, by Lillian Hellman; the 1983–1984 Circle in the Square Theatre revival of Heartbreak House, with Rex Harrison, Philip Bosco, Rosemary Harris, Amy Irving, Dana Ivey, and Stephen McHattie; and the Franco Zeffirelli productions of Terrence McNally's adaptation of The Lady of the Camellias (1963) and Eduardo De Filippo's Saturday Sunday Monday (1974). Her Shakespearean roles on Broadway included Emilia in the American National Theater and Academy production of Othello (1970), starring Moses Gunn; and as Juliet's nurse in director Theodore Mann's Circle in the Square production of Romeo and Juliet (1977). Other theater work included Major Barbara.

In 1986, Miner appeared at the Off Broadway Lucille Lortel Theatre as Gertrude Stein in the play Gertrude Stein and a Companion, by Win Wells, with Marian Seldes as Alice B. Toklas. Miner and Seldes reprised the roles in a June 1987 television version for the cable network Bravo. Miner also appeared for six seasons in repertory roles at the American Shakespeare Festival in Stratford, Connecticut.

Miner played Lenny Bruce's mother, Sally, in the Bob Fosse film Lenny (1974) alongside Dustin Hoffman (Lenny Bruce) and Valerie Perrine (Honey Bruce). She also appeared in The Swimmer (1968), Willie & Phil (1980), Endless Love (1981), and as the Mother Superior in Mermaids (1990). Her latter-day work in television included an episode of Law & Order.

Personal life
Miner was married to actor and writer Richard Merrell (1925–1998) for 35 years until his death from heart failure at age 73, on September 13, 1998.  The two often appeared together onstage, including in The Gin Game at the Missouri Repertory Theater,  prior to its renaming as the Kansas City Repertory Theatre in 2004, as well as in Night Must Fall, High Spirits, and what Miner called their favorite play together, Eugene O'Neill's Long Day's Journey Into Night at the Byrdcliffe Theater in Woodstock, New York.

Miner also adopted a daughter in the early 1960s named Molly Rose. A resident of Southbury, Connecticut in her later years, Miner died at the Bethel Health Care Facility in Bethel, Connecticut, after having been in failing health for several years. She was cremated after her death.

Filmography

Film

Television

References

External links

Jan Miner radiography at Radio Gold Index
Jan Miner performances in Radio City Playhouse
Jan Miner August 1970 radio interview on WTIC, Hartford, Connecticut
Jan Miner papers, 1932–1993, held by the Billy Rose Theatre Division, New York Public Library for the Performing Arts
Jan Miner at Find A Grave

1917 births
2004 deaths
Actresses from Boston
Colgate-Palmolive
American stage actresses
American radio actresses
American film actresses
American television actresses
20th-century American actresses
21st-century American women